Sir Thomas Butler (1358–1398) was the member of Parliament for the constituency of Gloucestershire for the parliament of January 1397.

References 

Members of the Parliament of England for Gloucestershire
English MPs January 1397
1358 births
1398 deaths
English knights